Mathew Hilakari is an Australian politician who is the current member for the district of Point Cook in the Victorian Legislative Assembly. He is a member of the Labor Party and was elected in the 2022 state election.

Before his election, Hilakari was the state convenor of the Victorian Socialist Left faction of the Labor Party.

References 

Year of birth missing (living people)
Living people
Members of the Victorian Legislative Assembly
21st-century Australian politicians
Australian Labor Party members of the Parliament of Victoria
Labor Left politicians